Songs in the Streets (Italian: Canzoni per le strade) is a 1950 Italian musical melodrama film directed by Mario Landi and starring Luciano Tajoli, Antonella Lualdi and Carlo Ninchi.

Cast
Luciano Taioli	 as Luciano Landi
Antonella Lualdi as Anna
Vera Bergman as	Susanna
Carlo Ninchi as Carlone
Ernesto Calindri as Commendatore Stefano Suvoldi
Anna Maria Bottini		as 	Marta
Eduardo Passarelli		as Man from Naples
Giorgio Berti		
Egisto Olivieri		
Gastone Barontini		
Gianni Berti		
Romolo Costa		
Renato Nardi		
Antonio Saviotti
Franco Volpi

References

Bibliography
 Chiti, Roberto & Poppi, Roberto. Dizionario del cinema italiano: Dal 1945 al 1959. Gremese Editore, 1991.

External links 
 
 Songs in the Streets at Variety Distribution

1950 films
1950 drama films
1950 musical films
1950s musical drama films
Italian musical drama films
Italian black-and-white films
1950s Italian-language films
Films directed by Mario Landi
1950s Italian films